John Alexander McGillivray (January 4, 1853 – February 14, 1911) was a Canadian lawyer and politician.

Born in Pickering Township, Canada West, McGillivray studied law under George Young Smith in Whitby, Lyman English in Oshawa, and Jones Brothers & Mackenzie in Toronto. He started practicing law with John Billings in Port Perry and later moved to Uxbridge, Ontario. He was elected to the first council of the Town of Uxbridge in 1872 and was mayor in 1890. In 1895, he was acclaimed to the House of Commons of Canada for the riding of Ontario North after the death of the sitting MP Frank Madill. A Liberal-Conservative, he was re-elected in June 1896 winning by one vote. The election was declared void in December 1896 and he did not run in the resulting by-election. From 1902 to 1906, he was Lieutenant-Colonel of the 34th Ontario Battalion of Militia.

He died in 1911 and is buried in the Uxbridge Cemetery.

References

External links
 

1853 births
1911 deaths
Conservative Party of Canada (1867–1942) MPs
Members of the House of Commons of Canada from Ontario
Mayors of places in Ontario
People from Uxbridge, Ontario